Eleven French ships of the French Navy have borne the name La Réale (royal):
 , a galley
 , a galley
 , a galley
 , a galley
 , a galley
 , a galley
 , a galley
 , a galley
 , a galley
 , a galley
  (1662), a prestige galley

French Navy ship names